{{DISPLAYTITLE:C40H54O2}}
The molecular formula C40H54O2 (molar mass: 566.85 g/mol, exact mass: 566.4124 u) may refer to:

 Diatoxanthin
 3'-Hydroxyechinenone

Molecular formulas